The Appleton–Hartree equation, sometimes also referred to as the Appleton–Lassen equation is a mathematical expression that describes the refractive index for electromagnetic wave propagation in a cold magnetized plasma. The Appleton–Hartree equation was developed independently by several different scientists, including Edward Victor Appleton, Douglas Hartree and German radio physicist H. K. Lassen.  Lassen's work, completed two years prior to Appleton and five years prior to Hartree, included a more thorough treatment of collisional plasma; but, published only in German, it has not been widely read in the English speaking world of radio physics.  Further, regarding the derivation by Appleton, it was noted in the historical study by Gilmore that Wilhelm Altar (while working with Appleton) first calculated the dispersion relation in 1926.

Equation
The dispersion relation can be written as an expression for the frequency (squared), but it is also common to write it as an expression for the index of refraction:

The full equation is typically given as follows:

or, alternatively, with damping term  and rearranging terms:

Definition of terms:

: complex refractive index

: imaginary unit

: electron collision frequency

: angular frequency

: ordinary frequency (cycles per second, or Hertz)

: electron plasma frequency

: electron gyro frequency

: permittivity of free space

: ambient magnetic field strength

: electron charge

: electron mass

: angle between the ambient magnetic field vector and the wave vector

Modes of propagation

The presence of the  sign in the Appleton–Hartree equation gives two separate solutions for the refractive index. For propagation perpendicular to the magnetic field, i.e., the '+' sign represents the "ordinary mode," and the '−' sign represents the "extraordinary mode." For propagation parallel to the magnetic field, i.e., the '+' sign represents a left-hand circularly polarized mode, and the '−' sign represents a right-hand circularly polarized mode. See the article on electromagnetic electron waves for more detail.

 is the vector of the propagation plane.

Reduced forms

Propagation in a collisionless plasma
If the electron collision frequency  is negligible compared to the wave frequency of interest , the plasma can be said to be "collisionless." That is, given the condition

,

we have

,

so we can neglect the  terms in the equation. The Appleton–Hartree equation for a cold, collisionless plasma is therefore,

Quasi-longitudinal propagation in a collisionless plasma
If we further assume that the wave propagation is primarily in the direction of the magnetic field, i.e., we can neglect the  term above. Thus, for quasi-longitudinal propagation in a cold, collisionless plasma, the Appleton–Hartree equation becomes,

See also
 Mary Taylor Slow
 Plasma (physics)
 Waves in plasmas
 List of plasma (physics) articles

References

Citations and notes

Electromagnetic radiation
Waves in plasmas